James Beresford (28 May 1764 – 29 September 1840) was a writer and clergyman. He was born in Upham in Hampshire and educated at Charterhouse School and became a fellow of Merton College, Oxford. He made translations and wrote religious books, but was chiefly known as the author of a satirical work, The Miseries of Human Life, considered to be a "minor classic in the genre". Beresford also wrote under the pseudonyms An Aspirant, Ignato Secudno, Samuel  Sensitive and Timothy Testy.  He was rector of Kibworth from 1812 until his death.

Bibliography
This list of works is taken from Beresford's obituary, published in the May 1841 edition of The Gentleman's Magazine.
 The Æneid of Virgil (1794)
 The Song of the Sun (1805)
 The Battle of Trafalgar (1805)
 The Miseries of Human Life (1806)
 A Discourse on Cruelty to the Brute Creation (1809)
 Bibliosophia, or Book-Wisdom (1810)
 A Thanksgiving Sermon (1814)
 Does Faith Insure Good Works? (1814)
 A Letter to Philo, in Answer to his Objections Against an Essay on Faith and Works (1815)
 An Examination of the Doctrines of Calvin (1818)
 On the Objects and Services of the Society for Promoting Christian Knowledge and its Diocesan and District Committees (1819)
 The Cross and the Crescent, an Heroic Metrical Romance (1824)
 Stand! An Earnest Address to the Friends of an Embodied Church in England and Ireland (1835)

References

1764 births
1840 deaths
British satirists
People from the City of Winchester
Fellows of Merton College, Oxford
People educated at Charterhouse School
People from Kibworth